The Kia Picanto is a city car that has been produced by the South Korean car manufacturer, Kia, since 2003. Other names of the car include Kia Morning in South Korea, Hong Kong, Taiwan (first two generations) and Chile, Kia EuroStar in Taiwan (first generation), Kia New Morning in Vietnam and the Naza Suria or Naza Picanto in Malaysia (first generation). The Picanto is primarily manufactured at the Donghee joint-venture plant in Seosan, South Korea, though some countries locally assemble complete knock-down versions of the car.



Name origin
The name “Picanto” relates to the Spanish and Italian words “picante/piccante”, meaning “spicy.”

The Korean’s version name “Morning” may trace its origin from the “Morning Calm”, as a reference to South Korea’s tradition. Since 1886, when a book written by Percival Lowell obtained large success in the United States in narrating the history of Korea, the country started to be internationally referred as “the Land of Morning calm”, and its ruling monarchy the Joseon, became known abroad as the “Morning Dynasty”.

First generation (SA; 2003)

The first generation Picanto was revealed at the 2003 Frankfurt Motor Show. An automatic gearbox (with torque converter) was optional for the petrol units. In some countries, it was sold with a 1.2-litre engine, also used on the newer Hyundai i10.

To increase its appeal in the European market, the Picanto was equipped with such features as CD player with MP3 audio playback, air conditioning, front and patented rear electric windows, remote central locking, and electric mirrors. These features were advertised in a short-lived campaign starring Marcus Grönholm.

Safety
Euro NCAP test results for a LHD, 5-door hatchback variant on a 2004 registration:

Facelift
2007
The Picanto received a facelift in 2007. Among the minor changes were the light clusters (front and rear), a new bumper and front grille. For the UK and Cyprus markets, the indicator stalk was switched to the opposite side. For the Italian market, a new bi-fuel LPG version debuted alongside the 1.0 L and 1.1 L engines. This model also saw a change in power steering configuration from hydraulic to electric.

2010
In 2009, for the 2010 model year, the Picanto received some minor interior and exterior changes, including a new front fascia that incorporates the 'tiger nose' grille. This facelifted model would not be exported to Europe.

Second generation (TA; 2011)

The second generation Picanto made its debut at the 2011 Geneva Motor Show. Designed by Kia's European design team based in Frankfurt, Germany, under the direction of Peter Schreyer, the new model is longer in wheelbase and overall length than its predecessor. The Picanto is offered with a choice of two gasoline engines: a 1.0 liter three-cylinder or a 1.25 liter four-cylinder. The Europe-spec 1.25 liter engine features ecoDynamics, Kia's start-stop system. In addition, there is also a petrol/LPG version of the 1.0 liter engine available. The Brazil version is equipped with a flex fuel version of the 1.0 liter engine that uses both petrol and ethanol.

The Picanto was available worldwide (except North America, Venezuela, China, and Singapore) as a 5-door hatchback while the European market received the exclusive 3-door variant. The 3-door version is the same length as the 5-door model, but it sports new windows and doors, different bumpers and a front grille with silver or red trim. In South Korea, the Morning is offered in a Sport Pack, which consists of the 3-door's front and rear bumpers, as well as a digital speedometer.

In some countries, the Picanto name is accompanied by a modifier for marketing reasons. Examples include Picanto Ion for Colombia, Picanto R for Ecuador, Picanto Flex for Brazil, Picanto K1 for Thailand, and Picanto 1250 for New Zealand. In the Indonesian market, the 1.0 liter variant was named Morning 1.0 to distinguish it from the 1.2 liter Picanto; this variant was sold in 2015 only.

The second-generation Picanto for the Pakistani market was launched at Pakistan Auto Parts Show (PAPS) 2019. It is locally assembled at Kia Lucky Motors' plant in Karachi and will be equipped with 1.0 liter engine. Production commenced in August 2019, with actual sales expected starting October 2019.

Picanto R-Cross
In November 2013, Kia Netherlands released a limited edition model called the Picanto R-Cross. Marketed to compete with the Volkswagen CrossUp, this model featured a black body kit that wrapped around the wheel wells and was fitted with 14" alloy wheels. Only 500 units of the R-Cross were produced.

Marketing
As part of the marketing campaign for the Picanto, Kia produced a promotional video featuring the world's first nail art animation. Over 900 artificial nails and 1,200 bottles of nail polish were used in a span of 25 days (with each nail taking two hours to paint) to create images of the Picanto in motion.

In the UK, the Picanto is the official sponsor of the ITV dating game show Take Me Out. Kia UK released a series of viral videos on their YouTube channel to promote both the car and the programme. Each video features actress Natasha Barrero, as she drives a black Picanto 3-door before being swooned over by different men.

A Lemon Grass Morning appears as the transforming robot Tobot D in the South Korean animated series Tobot.

Awards
The Picanto won the iF product design award in the "Transportation Design" category in 2011 and the Red Dot award in the "Automobiles, transportation, commercial and water vehicles" category in 2012. Top Gear magazine named the Picanto "Bargain Car of the Year" in 2011. The Association of Scottish Motoring Writers awarded the Picanto as "Best Small Car" in 2011. In South Africa, the Picanto took the Standard Bank People's Wheels Award for "Budget Buys - Affordability First" three years straight from 2011 to 2013. In 2016, J.D. Power and Associates awarded the Picanto on UK Vehicle Dependability Study (VDS) in the City Car category.

Facelift
2014
For the 2014 model year, the Morning in South Korea was updated to use the European three-door's front and rear bumpers with the headlights incorporating a new LED daytime running light system. The interior featured a revised instrument cluster with a digital speedometer. The silver trim was replaced with a gloss black trim. A touchscreen multimedia stereo system was offered as an option. The new model was equipped with seven airbags, a Cornering Brake Control system, a handbrake alarm, and height adjustable seat belts. Aside from the standard 1.0 liter gasoline engine, the Picanto was offered with a new "Eco-Plus" engine mated to a continuously variable transmission (CVT).

The international version of the Picanto remained unchanged aside from the new front bumper.

2015
For the 2015 model year, the Picanto received redesigned front and rear bumpers with new fog lamps. In addition, the car was offered with a turbocharged version of its 1.0 liter Kappa II engine, which increased power output from 69 hp to 106 hp. The revised engine met Euro 6 standards. The Picanto was also offered with optional  front disc brakes, an increase from the stock .

The facelifted Picanto debuted at the 2015 Geneva Motor Show in March and went on sale across Europe by the end of the month.

Safety
Euro NCAP
Euro NCAP test results for a LHD, 5-door hatchback variant on a 2011 registration:

ASEAN NCAP
ASEAN NCAP test results for a RHD, 5-door hatchback variant on a 2013 registration (with and without airbags):

The airbag variant tested was the Malaysian model equipped with six airbags, Electronic stability control (ESC), and Isofix. The non-airbag variant tested was the Thai version, which is similarly equipped as the Philippine and Indonesian models.

Australian NCAP
Australian NCAP test results for a RHD, 5-door hatchback variant on a 2016 registration:

Latin NCAP
The Picanto in its most basic Latin American configuration with no airbags, no ABS and no ESC received 0 stars for adult occupants and 1 star for toddlers from Latin NCAP in 2016 (only in 2020 did the protocol reach the Euro NCAP 2014 level).

 Global NCAP
The African version of the Picanto with driver airbag and no ABS received 3 stars for adult occupants and 2 stars for infants from Global NCAP in 2018 (similar to Latin NCAP 2013).

Third generation (JA; 2017)

The third-generation Picanto made its official global debut at the 2017 Geneva Motor Show. The new Picanto was equipped with a choice of three engines: the outgoing model's 1.0-liter Kappa II three-cylinder engine in the multi-point injected and turbocharged direct-injected versions, and the 1.2-liter Kappa II four-cylinder engine. Both 1.0-liter engines were mated exclusively with a 5-speed manual transmission, while the 1.2-liter engine was also offered with an optional 4-speed automatic transmission. The car features all-new safety features such as Torque Vectoring Brake Based (TVBB) system, Straight Line Stability (SLS), Forward Collision Warning System (FCWS) and Autonomous Emergency Braking (AEB).

GT-Line 

For the Malaysian market, the third-generation Picanto was launched in January 2018. It was powered by the naturally-aspirated 1.2-litre four-cylinder engine and was initially available in only one trim level (EX), with a 4-speed automatic transmission. In January 2019, the GT-Line variant was announced, featuring Autonomous Emergency Braking (AEB) and many other new features. In May 2019, a base variant KX and a crossover variant designated X-Line were added.

For the Indonesian market, the third generation Picanto went on sale in October 2019. It was powered by the 1.2-liter four-cylinder engine and offered in GT-Line and EX trim levels with either a 5-speed manual or a 4-speed automatic transmission. The Picanto was discontinued in Indonesia in 2022.

Marketing
Kia Motors in South Korea debuted the Morning in January 2017 with a series of TV commercials featuring actors Shim Eun-kyung, Park Jung-min, and Jin Kyung. For the international release of the Picanto and the fourth generation Kia Rio, Kia Motors produced two music videos featuring Korean-American singer Kate Kim and American musician Lee Radde in May 2017.

The Picanto GT Line was featured in Season 2 Episode 3 of The Grand Tour, where co-presenters James May and Richard Hammond drove it on a "lunchtime office car park racing" track at Houghton Hall business park in the Luton/Dunstable Urban Area.

Awards
The third generation Picanto won the iF product design award in the "Transportation Design" category  and the Red Dot award in the "Car Design" category in 2018.

What Car? named the Picanto "Best City Car" in their 2018 Car of the Year Awards.

Safety
Euro NCAP
Euro NCAP test results in 2017 for a LHD, 5-door hatchback variant with standard equipment on a 2017 registration:

Euro NCAP test results in 2017 for a LHD, 5-door hatchback variant with optional safety pack on a 2017 registration:

Latin NCAP
Latin NCAP results for the Korean-made Picanto in its most basic Latin American configuration with two airbags, no load limiters, and no ESC under their new rating protocol (similar to Euro NCAP 2014) in 2020 for a LHD, 5-door hatchback variant with only one airbag. It received a zero-star rating.

2020 facelift
In June 2020, Kia introduced a mid-life facelift. Featuring styling tweaks on the exterior, new technology and powertrains. Exterior update on standard models includes restyled headlights and grille, whilst the GT-Line and X-Line trims were given restyled front and rear bumpers. Interior updates includes a 4.2-inch instrument panel and 8-inch infotainment system with Apple CarPlay and Android Auto supports. Other interior updates are new upholstery and different colour trim options.

The engine range has also been updated with revised fuel injection and engine management to improve fuel economy as well as a five-speed automatic gearbox to replace the older four-speed one. Safety and driver assist technology has been updated with features such as lane-keeping aid and emergency stop signal, the latter of which automatically turn on the car’s hazard lights in an event of sudden braking.

Reliability
In January 2013, the Picanto was named most reliable car in the UK, according to data published by Moneysupermarket.com in conjunction with Warranty Direct. Out of a Reliability Index (RI) of 100 (the lower the score, the fewer problems reported by owners), the Picanto achieved a score of 3.00/100.

Motorsport

The Picanto is an official race car in Poland's Kia Platinum Cup, a racing organization created by Kia Motors Polska and Polish Automobile and Motorcycle Association. The organization started in 2006 as the Kia Picanto Cup before establishing a partnership with Grupa Lotos to form the Kia Lotos Race a year later. Following the 2017 season, the organization was changed to Kia Platinum Cup after PKN Orlen replaced Grupa Lotos as the title sponsor.

The Morning is also an official race car in the Korea Speed Festival.

In 2018, the Kia Picanto GT Cup was established in Portugal by Kia Motors Portugal and CRM Motorsport.

Chinese copy controversy

In 2015, a Chinese low-speed electric vehicle manufacturer Yogomo released the Yogomo 330 electric car, which is a near-exact copy of the second generation Picanto.

Sales 

The Picanto was Kia's best selling vehicle in Europe from 2004 to 2006, accounting for a third of the brand sales volumes during these years.

References

External links

 (South Korea)
 (UK)

Picanto
Cars introduced in 2004
2010s cars
2020s cars
City cars
Hatchbacks
Front-wheel-drive vehicles
ANCAP superminis
ASEAN NCAP superminis
Euro NCAP superminis
Global NCAP superminis
Latin NCAP superminis
Vehicles with CVT transmission